New Caledonia competed at the 2015 Pacific Games in Port Moresby, Papua New Guinea from 4 to 18 July 2015. New Caledonia listed 354 competitors as of 4 July 2015. Four competitors were qualified in two sports.

Athletics

Parasport
Men
 Avelino Monteiro

Basketball

Women
 Dominique Armand
 Awéko Passa
 Adeline Souque
 Marie-Hélène Trocas
 Maryko Durand
 Myriam Fenuafanote
 Roselyne Forest
 Samantha Honda
 Yolène Koteureu
 Alissone Laukau
 Diana Moutry
 Lingdsey Niuaiti Épouse Tetuanui

Men
 Beniela Adjouhgniope
 Emmanuel Soeria-Ouamba
 Jean-Jacques Taufana
 Rodrigue Tetainanuarii
 Cédric Tetuanui
 Joan Delaunay-Belleville
 Ruben Ha-Ho
 Sébastien Hnawia
 Yann Mathelon
 Karyl Paillandi
 Landry Peu
 Stéphane Saminadin
 Steeven Sillant

Beach volleyball

Women
 Moone Armonie Kohnu
 Aurelie Konhu

Men
 Benjamin Hweillia
 Jonathan Taoupoulou

Bodybuilding

New Caledonia qualified 5 athletes in bodybuilding:

Women
 Virginie Foucault

Men
 Guillaume Bruneau
 Nelson Sanmarso
 Matthieu Soerjana
 Yvan Thales

Boxing

Cricket

New Caledonia qualified men's and women's teams in cricket (30 players):

Women
Women's tournament.
 Rosina Angexetine
 Louise Jeka
 Emmanuel Katrawi
 Sonia Kaudre
 Elise Kecine
 Andrea Kilama
 Madanie Kowi
 Emma Malla
 Appolonie Mazeno
 Rowena Philippon
 Jeannette Qaeze
 Rose Siwa
 Louise Wahmowe
 Louise Wawine
 Jessica Wenevine

Men
Men's tournament.
 Nicholls Adjouhgniope
 Kalepo Folituu
 Constant Haeweng
 Jean-Yves Hmae
 Ipahnue Kecine
 Johnatan Lapacas
 David Magulu
 Nicolas Magulu
 Atea Nea
 Joseph Nigote
 Laurent Onocia
 Noel Sinyeue
 Charles Siwene
 Steeve Tchidopoane
 Jonas Waneux

Football

New Caledonia qualified men's and women's teams in football (46 athletes):

Women
 – Women's tournament.
 Josiane Ayawa
 Kim Maguire
 Chrystelle Nigote
 Lyndsay Nyipie
 Julia Paul
 Honorine Pouidja
 Myranda Rabah
 Jessica Ries
 Noé Valefakaaga
 Hélène Waengene
 Christelle Wahnawe
 Bernadette Euribeari
 Marie- Déborah Wanakaija
 Joyce Waunie
 Céline Xolawawa
 Karine Xozame
 Sidney Gatha
 Isabelle Hace
 Marielle Haocas
 Louise Humuni
 Glenda Jaine
 Brenda Kenon
 Aurélie Lalie

Men
 – Men's tournament.

Head coach: Thierry Sardo

Golf

Karate

Outrigger canoeing

Powerlifting

 Maxime Glandais
 Philippe La
 Florent Poulet
 Frédérick Warsidi

Rugby sevens

 Women
4th – Women's tournament
 Shirley Benemie
 Djesy Gaia
 Lydie Wamejo
 Manon Boudet
 Theresa Boulouguen
 Louise Waiane
 Vanessa Beaudouin
 Claire Hillaireau
 Yolaine Yengo
 Marie Hélène Wahnawe
 Anne-Marie Waitreu
 Marie Aymeric

Sailing

Shooting

New Caledonia qualified seven athletes in shooting:

Women
 Marion Roumagne

Men
 Christian Jahja
 Walter Le Pironnec
 Warenn Le Pironnec
 Kévin Lepigeon
 Johan Perchard  – 25 m pistol mixed.
 Philippe Simoni

Squash

Swimming

New Caledonia qualified 20 athletes in swimming:

Women
 Suzanne Afchain
 Lucie Auberger
 Leilani Flament
 Lara Grangeon
 Armelle Hidrio
 Ylenka Maurin
 Lea Ricarrere
 Charlotte Robin
 Emma Terebo
 Adeline Williams

Men
 Kevin Calmettes
 Jeremie Dufourmantelle
 Julien-Pierre Goyetche
 Florent Janin
 Emmanuel Limozin
 Thibaut Mary
 Thomas Oswald
 Lou Pujol
 Hugo Ricarrere
 Hugo Tormento

Table tennis

Women
 Ornella Bouteille
 Fabianna Faehau
 Cathy Gauthier

Taekwondo

Tennis

Triathlon

Volleyball

Weightlifting

Women
Julietta Mafutuna

Men
 Igor Lagikula
 Petelo Lagikula

Notes

References

2015 in New Caledonian sport
Nations at the 2015 Pacific Games
New Caledonia at the Pacific Games